Do Re Mi is a 1996 Philippine musical comedy film directed by Ike Jarlego Jr. The film stars Donna Cruz, Regine Velasquez, and Mikee Cojuangco. The movie is considered to be the most successful Filipino musical comedy of all time. The film's title is a play between the solfège and a portmanteau using the first two letters of Donna, Regine and Mikee's first names.

Plot
The film uses the concept of three female singers who, "as they sing their way through life's ups and downs, they build a friendship strong enough to last a lifetime."

In an attempt to salvage their group's music career, Reggie Mendoza (Regine Velasquez), a self-confessed lola's girl, and Mikki Tolentino (Mikee Cojuangco), a man-hating tomboy and breadwinner of her family, discover Donnette Legaspi (Donna Cruz), a vainglorious, and spoiled rich girl, to be part of their musical trio, DoReMi. Despite their drastic differences in both their personalities and principles, their shared love for music allowed them to consider pursuing a music career in Japan, only to figure out in an interrogation at the local airport that a fly-by-night recruitment agency had falsified their documents and faked their passports. Due to this mishap, the girls travel to an unknown rural province, putting themselves in a self-imposed exile after the embarrassment they faced after chasing their dreams. While still considering the idea of becoming successful in the music industry, the girls help convert a small local restaurant into a mini bar where they can perform to sustain their daily needs and expenses. Their successful stint as vocal performers consistently draw huge crowds, and their popularity in the area attracted several record executives to sign them for a recording contract.

On the day of the group's contract signing, both Donnette and Mikki back out from signing the record deal, leaving a disheartened Reggie as a solo act. As Reggie pursued a career as a successful solo singer, Donnette channeled her efforts to help orphans and other abused children in social welfare, and Mikki, started her own family, and food business with Toto (Gary Estrada), whom she met and fell in love with in the province. In a charitable gala where all three of them unknowingly participate in, the girls are brought together once more as they perform the song they co-wrote together.

Planning and production
According to a retrospective by ABS-CBN, the film "was originally titled Sana'y Wala Nang Wakas 2," based loosely on the 1986 film starring Sharon Cuneta, Cherie Gil, and Dina Bonnevie.

Promotion
Being hailed as the highly anticipated movie of 1996, there was extreme hype behind the collaboration between the three main actresses. To promote the movie, Cruz, Velasquez and Cojuangco appeared in an episode of T.G.I.S., reprising their roles in the film. The girls also appeared in all three major networks, ABS-CBN, GMA Network and ABC (now 5) for several interviews in various talk and variety shows. For the film and soundtrack's press release, Cruz, Velasquez, and Cojuangco performed the songs in a promotional mini-concert.

Despite being part of the movie, Velasquez' vocals were not part in recording of the movie's soundtrack, as it was a then-upcoming VIVA Records singer named Krystine Marcaida, who sang vocals on her part.  In the movie version, Velasquez was able to record her vocals just in time before the movie was released.

Reception
The film was released to critical acclaim, with majority of the critics praising the chemistry and comic timing of Cruz, Velasquez and Cojuangco altogether, while still establishing character distinction as individuals.  The movie became the most successful Filipino musical comedy film of the nineties earning ₱170 million in its one-month theatrical run. The song "I Can", which was the main theme of the movie, also became a number-one hit in the Philippines.

Cast

Main cast
 Donna Cruz as Donnette Legaspi
 Regine Velasquez as Reggie Mendoza
 Mikee Cojuangco as Mikki Tolentino
Supporting cast
 Gloria Romero as Reggie's Lola
 Gary Estrada as Toto
 Berting Labra as Mikki's Father
 Evangeline Pascual as Donette's Mother
 Ramil Rodriguez as Donette's Father
 Anthony Cortez as Julio
 Melisse Santiago as Nene
 Lee Robin Salazar as Joey
 Lorli Villanueva as Mikki's Mother
 Ricky Rivero as Boyet
 Gerard Faisan as Victor
 Carlos Ramirez I as Kambal I
 Carlos Ramirez II as Kambal II
 Elaine Kemuel as Dorothy
 Archie Adamos as Nene's Father
Cameos cast
 Cesar Montano
 Ruby Rodriguez
 Menchu Macapagal

Soundtrack

DoReMi: Music from the Motion Picture features songs performed by Donna Cruz, Mikee Cojuangco, Regine Velasquez and girl group Vanna Vanna and was produced by Viva Records. All of the songs were produced by Margot M. Gallardo, with the album's main theme, "I Can," being co-produced by Louie M. Ocampo.

Track listing

References

External links
 

1996 films
1990s Tagalog-language films
1990s English-language films
1990s musical comedy films
Philippine musical comedy films
Neo Films films
1996 multilingual films
Philippine multilingual films
Films directed by Ike Jarlego Jr.